Statue of Alfred the Great may refer to:

Statue of Alfred the Great, Pewsey
Statue of Alfred the Great, Southwark
Statue of Alfred the Great, Wantage
Statue of Alfred the Great, Winchester